Ieva Dainytė (born 24 February 2005) is a Lithuanian cross-country skier.

Biography

2021 World Championships 
Dainytė represented Lithuania at the FIS Nordic World Ski Championships 2021. She finished 97th in women's sprint, failed to qualify for individual 10 km race and was part of Lithuania's relay and sprint teams. 

In pair with Eglė Savickaitė, Dainytė participated in women's team sprint competition. Lithuanian pair finished 26th overall and failed to qualify for the final. Dainytė was a part of Lithuanian national relay team that was ranked in 15th place.

2022 Olympics 
Dainytė was selected to represent Lithuania at the 2022 Winter Olympics. Dainytė finished 91st in women's 10 km race, 86th in women's sprint and 23rd in women's team sprint.

References

External links 

2005 births
Lithuanian female cross-country skiers
Living people
Cross-country skiers at the 2022 Winter Olympics
Olympic cross-country skiers of Lithuania